Kamli Ishq Di is an Indian Punjabi language Drama television series that premiered from 13 January 2020 on Zee Punjabi. It starred Jashan Singh Kohli and Sehar Shehnaz in the lead roles. It is an official remake of Zee Marathi's TV series Lagira Zhala Ji. It is produced by Reliance Big Synergy and ended on 11 June 2021.

Plot 
A free-spirited Mahi falls in love with Veer, who aspires to join the Indian Army. Will the duo come together and surpass all the odds?

Cast 
 Jashan Singh Kohli as Veer
 Sehar Shehnaz/Unknown as Mahi
 Mandeep Kaur
 Navtaran Singh
 Sandeep Kapoor
 Rajinder Rozy

Adaptations

References

External links 
 
 Kamli Ishq Di at ZEE5

2020 Indian television series debuts
2021 Indian television series endings
Punjabi-language television shows
Zee Punjabi original programming